Laoticus may refer to:
 Amorphophallus laoticus, a tropical plant species of the Amorphophallus genus
 Croton laoticus, sometimes called Rushfoil, trees or shrubs of the Croton (plant)
 Heterometrus laoticus, an Asian forest scorpion